South West France (in French often Sud-ouest) can refer to:

 A wine region, see South West France (wine region)
 An EU Parliament constituency, see South-West France (European Parliament constituency)
 A geographic area, part of Southern France

See also

 SNCASO, also known as Sud-Ouest, a former aircraft manufacturer